The Church of the Holy Archangels, also known as Deir ez-Zeitun ("Monastery of the Olive Tree"), is an Armenian Orthodox Christian church in the Armenian Quarter of the Old City of Jerusalem.

Traditions 

According to a tradition, this site was the house of High Priest Annas, although earlier traditions also placed the house at different sites, such as on Jehoshaphat Street or on Mount Zion.

One of the chambers supposedly was the prison of Christ. However, the gospels have divergent accounts about whether Jesus was brought to Annas' or Caiaphas' house/court. Therefore, the Armenian Monastery of Saint Saviour (the "House of Caiaphas") also has a prison of Christ.

History 

The monastery was founded in the 12th or 13th century.

References

 
  

Armenian Apostolic churches in Jerusalem